Habitat for Humanity Canada is a Canadian non-governmental, and non-profit organization. In 1985, the Habitat for Humanity movement spread to Canada with the first Canadian build in Winkler, Manitoba. Habitat for Humanity in Canada has since grown to 50 affiliates in 10 provinces and 3 territories and has successfully provided over 3,800 families with safe, decent and affordable housing. Each affiliate is managed by a local board of directors. With the first build in Quebec, Habitat homes have been built in all ten provinces in 1998 and in all three territories in 2014. World’s first ReStore was opened by Habitat for Humanity Winnipeg in 1991.

History
In September 1984, Jimmy Carter and his wife took their first Habitat work trip, the Jimmy & Rosalynn Carter Work Project, to New York City. Their involvement sparked interest in Habitat's work across the nation and Habitat for Humanity International experienced a dramatic increase in the number of new affiliates around the country. Habitat for Humanity Canada was founded in 1985, with the inaugural meeting and first home built in Winkler, Manitoba. As Gloria and Ernie Penner were raising their children in a two-bedroom apartment, homeownership seemed beyond their reach. After a six-month application process, they were told they’d been chosen as Habitat for Humanity’s first home recipients in Canada. Ernie and Gloria Penner of Winkler received the keys to the first Habitat for Humanity house built in Canada in 1985. In 2011, the Penner family still called their Habitat house, home. In 1987, Winnipeg became home to the first Canadian affiliate. In early 1988, the Habitat for Humanity Canada national office was established in Waterloo, Ontario.

With the first build in Quebec, Habitat homes have been built in all ten provinces in 1998.

Habitat for Humanity Canada launched its Aboriginal Housing Program on September 1, 2007 thanks to the support of the Canada Mortgage and Housing Corporation. The objective of the program is to engage Habitat for Humanity affiliates across Canada in implementing pilot programs that will help make the Habitat homeownership model available to more Aboriginal people.

Habitat for Humanity in Manitoba

Winnipeg became home to the first Canadian affiliate in 1987.

World’s first ReStore is opened by Habitat for Humanity Winnipeg with the help of five volunteers in 1991.

Habitat for Humanity in Newfoundland and Labrador
Habitat for Humanity Newfoundland and Labrador Inc. is an affiliate of Habitat for Humanity Canada incorporated in Newfoundland and Labrador in May 1994.

In 2012, Habitat Newfoundland sent its first Global Village Team to Thailand.

Habitat for Humanity in Northwest Territories
Construction of the first Habitat for Humanity homes in the Northwest Territories began in June 2014.

Habitat for Humanity in Nova Scotia

Habitat was established in Halifax, Nova Scotia in 1992 as Habitat for Humanity Halifax Dartmouth. In 2011, they became Habitat for Humanity Nova Scotia, a provincial affiliate of Habitat for Humanity Canada.

In 2003, a chapter was established on the South Shore, which dedicated its first home in Bridgewater in 2006.

The affiliate opened a ReStore in Burnside, Nova Scotia in 2006.

Habitat for Humanity Halifax-Dartmouth hosted its first Women Build in 2007. Habitat HRM dedicated its 25th home in Sackville in 2008.

Habitat for Humanity in Nunavut
Habitat for Humanity Iqaluit became an affiliate of Habitat for Humanity Canada in 2005. Iqaluit was the first Canadian affiliate to benefit from Global Village support, in 2007. They built the first home in 2007 with the assistance of two teams of Global Village volunteers. The second home was built in 2009 with the assistance of 3 more Global Village teams.

Habitat for Humanity in Ontario

Habitat for Humanity Toronto

Habitat Toronto was established in 1988 as an affiliate of Habitat for Humanity Canada. Habitat for Humanity Toronto was a local grassroots organization from its founding in 1988 to 2001. Every couple of years the organization built one or two homes thanks to a small group of dedicated volunteers and corporate donors. In 2001 Habitat Toronto embarked on their biggest challenge yet, attempting to build seven homes at once. In 2009, over 80 homes were built at three different build sites, due to the generosity of committed volunteers and donors.

In 2008 11,000 volunteers donated over 84,658 hours of their time and talent to Habitat for Humanity Toronto.

Habitat Toronto has built homes throughout Toronto and recently broke ground on their 200th affordable home.

Homes Built from 2006-2009:

Source:

In 2007-2008 Habitat Toronto successfully built the first official Energy Star certified homes in Canadian Habitat History.

In 2009, the organization broke ground on Canada's first solar-paneled homes built by Habitat for Humanity at the Williams Way Build Site. The homes being built here are expected to be upwards of 25% more efficient than the Ontario Building Code Standards. This will help reduce the cost of energy paid by the low-income families moving in. Habitat homes also include Energy Star certified appliances, further reducing the energy used by the homes.

Habitat Toronto operates three ReStores in the Toronto area.

ReStores also conduct salvages, where a group of volunteers travel to homes and disassemble kitchens and other units and transport them to the ReStores. The ReStores help redirect larges amounts of materials from landfills to homebuilders and renovators.

The ReStores grossed $2.5 million in 2009 while redirecting 1,497 metric tons of reusable construction materials from landfills.

The average cost for a Habitat Toronto home is between $100,000 and $120,000. Mortgage payments from Habitat Toronto homeowners go directly into a trust to build more Habitat homes. The Habitat model empowers families to help other families. For every 12 homes built in Toronto, one additional home per year can be built from the mortgage income alone.

Habitat Toronto holds many special events during the year at build sites and other venues. These events can be a special build day for a celebration such as Mother's Day Build. Actress and supermodel Monika Schnarre participated in the 2010 Mother's Day Build with her mother.

Each year Habitat Toronto holds a "blitz build" that targets a specific group and tries to get a large portion of that group out to build. In 2009, the organization held a Women Build event where 300 female volunteers helped build 16 homes in Scarborough.

Habitat Toronto also holds an Annual Gingerbread Build in December where children are able to build gingerbread houses to help raise funds for the building of safe, decent and affordable homes.

Habitat for Humanity Toronto has been awarded numerous times for their work in the community. They were presented with an Urban Leadership Award for Renewal in 2010. The City of Toronto also honoured the organization in 2010 as an Affordable Housing Champion in Toronto.

Habitat for Humanity Toronto CEO Neil Hetherington was named as one of the Top 40 under 40 by The Caldwell Partners International in 2009.

In 2014 Habitat Toronto, Habitat Brampton, Habitat York merged to form Habitat GTA.

Habitat for Humanity Heartland Ontario

Habitat for Humanity London Inc. was established in 1993. In 2012 Habitat for Humanity London expanded its reach and formally became Habitat for Humanity Oxford Middlesex Elgin and then in 2014 became Habitat for Humanity Heartland Ontario after the acquisition of the Stratford Perth affiliate.

The London ReStore first opened in May 1995, occupying 3,300 sq. ft. in a smaller portion of a former Consumers Distributing outlet in East London. Expansion started in 1999 into nearby warehouse space and in 2001, the ReStore moved its entire operations into 10,000 sq ft of combined retail, warehouse, and offices.

In 2009-10, an ambitious strategic plan called for exponential growth for the affiliate over the next five years. The East location outgrew the available space, so in 2011, a second London store was opened in 9,500 sq ft of retail space in a more central location.

The second part of that expansion was the renovation of an entire 18,000 sq ft building with combined warehouse, retail, and office space as its headquarters in 2012. The Woodstock ReStore was opened in 2013 to service Oxford County, and Habitat Heartland Ontario assumed operations of the Stratford ReStore in 2014. St. Thomas ReStore opened in August 2015, and the Listowel ReStore followed in January 2017. 100% of the ReStores revenue supports the administrative costs of Habitat for Humanity Heartland Ontario. As of January 2021, Heartland merged with Habitat for Humanity Brant-Norfolk, adding another 2 already established stores to their network located in Brantford and Simcoe respectively.

Habitat for Humanity in Prince Edward Island
Habitat for Humanity Prince Edward Island was founded in 1996. Before 2011, Habitat for Humanity had built 35 houses over the last decade on P.E.I.

Habitat for Humanity in Quebec
Habitat for Humanity Montreal was founded in January 1998. Stephen Rotman became president of Habitat for Humanity Montreal on August 21, 1998. The first build project was dedicated on October 31, 1999, in the Saint-Henri district of Montreal. The project consisted of building two adjacent houses to provide homes for two families. With the first build in Quebec, Habitat homes have been built in all ten provinces.

Formed in February 1998, the McGill University Campus Chapter Habitat for Humanity is one of twelve Habitat for Humanity campus chapters in Canada.

On October 17, 2006 Montreal's ReStore was opened at 7177 Newman Boulevard in LaSalle, Quebec. The Habitat for Humanity Montreal ReStore was the 50th opened in Canada, the 1st in the province of Quebec. The first store manager was Matt Johnston. By mid-afternoon, on October 18, 2006, Matt Johnston had sold about $800 worth of merchandise. Initially, unlike the ReStore shops in the rest of Canada, the Montreal outlet did not accept donations from the general public. "We want to sell quality goods to people, so, for now, we're relying on corporate donations," Rotman explained for The Gazette (Montreal) in 2006.

By October 2006, the Montreal chapter has built three homes. "It costs about $75,000 to build a house, plus all the donated labour and materials," Stephen Rotman said for The Gazette (Montreal) in 2006. Rotman was optimistic that the new ReStore will generate "a couple of hundred thousand dollars a year" allowing the local Habitat group to step up the pace of construction to two houses a year.

Habitat for Humanity Montreal built the first two houses in 1999 and the 3rd in 2002.

On May 15, 2007, under leadership of Stephen Rotman, president of Habitat for Humanity Montréal, was unveiled a new house building project, which provide a home for a family in the Mercier–Hochelaga-Maisonneuve borough of East-end Montreal.

In December 2008, two families moved in their houses, the seventh project built by Habitat for Humanity Montreal. Construction on this duplex had started in the spring. To build this latest duplex, Genworth Financial Canada, Home Depot Canada and MCAP donated $360,000 between 2006 and 2008. Construction companies also kicked in another $75,000 worth of materials. "It’s a very complicated process because we have to find the land and the volunteers that sign up to work on the site," said, in December 2008, Louise Legault, a local freelance writer who volunteers for the Habitat for Humanity Montreal. In addition to the volunteers, Habitat also pays to have professionals do the foundation, plumbing and electrical work. "Volunteers are mostly involved with the interior finishing work," she says. "Right now there are a lot of doors and lighting in the store," says Legault.

Until 2009, Habitat for Humanity Montreal had built seven houses.

On August 24, 2009, ReStore Montreal was closed and reopened at 4399 Notre-Dame Street W, three times the size, on September 8.

The manager of Habitat for Humanity Montreal’s ReStore was Karin Kloppenburg in 2010.

In August 2010, for a fourth consecutive year, TD participated in a Habitat for Humanity Montreal project by donating $10,000. On August 11 and 12, 2010, approximately 30 TD employees helped build a duplex on 5096-5098, Sainte-Clotilde in Saint-Henri district.

On September 25, 2010, Habitat for Humanity Montreal hold its first ever Party in the Park event, at Parc Gadbois, the Saint-Henri district.

Isabel St Germain Singh became Habitat for Humanity MontrealCEO in November 2010.

Charles Lafortune was named as its new spokesperson, in a ceremony held at ReStore, on July 7, 2011.

Two renovations projects in the borough of Mercier–Hochelaga-Maisonneuve began on November 15, 2011. Charles Lafortune, a spokesperson for Habitat for Humanity Montreal, was in attendance for the ground breaking ceremony, held at 9616-9618, Avenue Dubuisson, between 10:00am – 12:00pm.

Habitat for Humanity Montreal organized the first annual fundraising gala on May 17, 2012 at the Montreal Delta Centre-Ville. The evening, hosted by comedian Charles Lafortune, welcomed more than 300 people entertained by a colourful circus show.

Under leadership of Isabel Singh (President & CEO for Habitat for Humanity Montreal) and Kathy Raymond (Director of ReStores), Habitat Montreal ReStore was re-launched on January 24, 2013.

Students at The Chateauguay Valley Career Education Centre Carpentry program helped to construct two homes for Habitat for Humanity, in November 2013.

In 2014, the members of the Board of Directors of Habitat for Humanity Quebec were: Stephen Rotman, Board Chair, Sandra Santos, Treasure, Danny Bonneville, Jean-Maurice Forget, Paul Martel, Robert Murray, Denis Pilon, Marc Poisson, Stephen Trottier; Madeleine Martins served as CEO.

The second fundraising gala was organized at Windsor Hotel (Montreal) on May 1, 2014. The fashion gala was given at the Windsor by the Maison Marie Saint Pierre for the profit of Habitat of Humanity.

Habitat for Humanity in Yukon

Habitat for Humanity Yukon was given official affiliate status in September 2004. Todd Hardy was a founding member and the first President. The first projects of Habitat for Humanity Yukon were homes at the following Whitehorse, Yukon locations: Kodiak Place (1 unit, completed November 2006); Keewenaw Drive (2 units, completed July 2010); Wheeler Street (3 units, completed February 2011) and Pintail Place (3 units, completed February 2013).

References

External links

 
 Habitat for Humanity Canada is Rebuilding this Holiday Season with Bricks, Nails and Even the Kitchen Sink 

Charities based in Canada
Organizations established in 1985
Affordable housing
Canada
1985 establishments in Canada